Symposium Cafe Restaurant & Lounge is a restaurant chain in the province of Ontario, which serves as an all-day restaurant, café, and bar. The first restaurant was founded in 1996 in the City of London by the Bill and Terry Argo. They began franchising in 2004, and had thirty locations as of the end of 2017. That year the company received the Franchisor of the Year (Traditional Franchises) from the Canadian Franchise Association Awards of Excellence. Services it provides include dine-in, take-out, and catering, focusing on continental and European food. The décor of locations also reflects the art and culture of the Mediterranean region.

References

External links
Symposium Cafe

1996 establishments in Ontario
Restaurant chains in Canada
Companies based in London, Ontario
Restaurants in Toronto